The following lists the top 25 singles of 2019 in Australia from the Australian Recording Industry Association (ARIA) end-of-year singles chart.

"Old Town Road" by Lil Nas X featuring Billy Ray Cyrus was the top selling single of 2019 in Australia, spending thirteen weeks at No. 1 and being certified ten times platinum. It was followed by "Dance Monkey" by Tones and I, which became the year's highest-selling Australian song, being certified seven times platinum and spending 21 consecutive weeks atop the chart, breaking the record for the most weeks at number one by an Australian artist, which was previously held by Justice Crew's 2014 song "Que Sera" (9 weeks),  and the record for most weeks at number one in Australian chart history, previously held by Ed Sheeran's 2017 song "Shape of You" (15 weeks).

See also  
 List of number-one singles of 2019 (Australia) 
 List of top 10 singles in 2019 (Australia) 
 List of Top 25 albums for 2019 in Australia 
 2019 in music 
 ARIA Charts 
 List of Australian chart achievements and milestones

References 

Australian record charts
2019 in Australian music
Australia Top 25 Singles